The music of the Canary Islands reflects its cultural heritage. The islands used to be inhabited by the Guanches which are related to Berbers; they mixed with Spaniards, who live on the islands now. A variant of Jota is popular, as is Latin music, which has left its mark in the form of the timple guitar.
There has been a strong connection with Cuban music, Venezuelan, Puerto Rican, and other Caribbean countries both through commerce and migration.

Popular dances from the Canary Islands include:
 Isas
 Tajaraste
 Baile del Candil
 Baile de Cintas
 Danza de Enanos
 El Santo Domingo
 Tanganillo
 Folias
 Malagueña

Of these, the Isas, a local variation of Jota, are the best-known and most characteristic of the Canary Islands. They are graceful music, with much variation between islands. In some places, a captain leads the dance and organizes others in a chain as the dance grows more and more complex.

Rondalla arrangements are very common. Instruments include charangas, timples (similar to a cavaquinho / ukulele), castanets, panderetas, lauds and guitars. A peculiar ensemble in El Hierro island is made of pito herreño players (a wooden transverse flute) and drums. Some ritual dances in Tenerife island are led by a tabor pipe player. Joyful music for carnival lies to a big extent on brass bands and Latin American patterns.

Canary musicians
 Brandania
 Pedro Guerra
 Rosana
 Valentina la de Sabinosa

Canary Islands
Canarian culture